Freda Yetta Brown (née Lewis; 9 June 1919 – 26 May 2009) was an Australian political activist and feminist who was a member of the Communist Party of Australia and later the Socialist Party. She is the only Australian woman to have been awarded a Lenin Peace Prize.

Biography
Freda Brown was born Freda Yetta Lewis in Sydney. She joined the Communist Party of Australia in 1936. She worked in her father's signwriting business, before becoming a journalist working for the Radio Times, and then later for various Communist-affiliated trade union papers. She married Bill Brown, an electrician she met at the New Theatre, in 1943.

After the Second World War, Brown joined the New Housewives Association, later known as Union of Australian Women, and ultimately became its president. She was instrumental in the United Nations' celebration of International Women's Year in 1975. She was active in the Women's International Democratic Federation (WIDF), being elected president of the organisation in 1975, a position she held until 1991.

Brown was a member of the Central Committee of the Communist Party of Australia from 1943 to 1971.

In 1971, Brown's husband Bill was expelled from the CPA as a member of a faction that remained loyal to the USSR after the 1968 invasion of Czechoslovakia, a move that the party had condemned. Bill and Freda then joined the Soviet-aligned Socialist Party.

On 8 March 2004, International Women's Day, Brown, then 85, was honoured for her work against apartheid by the South African government in a ceremony in Johannesburg to mark the 10th anniversary of the end of Apartheid.  Throughout the 1970s and 1980s, in her role as President of the WIDF, she had worked closely with the women's section of the African National Congress to bring South African women to Europe, North America and Australia to give testimony of conditions under Apartheid.

References

External links
 Obituary in the Sydney Morning Herald, 27 May 2009.

1919 births
2009 deaths
Australian communists
Australian feminists
Lenin Peace Prize recipients
People from Sydney
Australian socialist feminists
Communist Party of Australia members